Ion Horaţiu Crişan (1928–1994) was a Romanian historian and archaeologist. He conducted research in South-Eastern and Central Europe, focusing on Geto-Dacians and Celts.

He has been was very involved with the research at the archaeological site called Şanţul Mare (The Big Ditch), 7 km from Pecica, Arad County, Romania. He placed the Dacian settlement Ziridava, mentioned by Ptolemy in his Geographia, at this location with a high degree of certainty. He wrote a book named Ziridava - The digs from "Șanțul Mare" from 1960, 1961, 1962, 1964, focused on the archaeological digs performed in 1960s at this ancient city.

Bibliography 
 Burebista and His Time, Volume 20 of Bibliotheca historica Romaniae: Monographies, Bucharest, Editura Academiei Republicii Socialiste România, 1978
 Ziridava - Săpăturile de la "Șanțul Mare" din anii 1960, 1961, 1962, 1964 (Ziridava - The digs from "Șanțul Mare" from 1960, 1961, 1962, 1964), Arad, Comitetul de Cultură și Educație Socialistă al Județului Arad, 1978
 Crişan's Bibliography at History Institute Cluj-Napoca

About him

See also 
 Burebista
 Dacia
 List of Romanian archaeologists
 Romanian archaeology

Notes

References

Ancient

Modern

Further reading 

 Some of Ion Horaţiu Crişan's books on Amazon UK
 Some of Ion Horaţiu Crişan's books on Google Books
 Crişan's Bibliography at History Institute Cluj-Napoca 
 Section on Crişan's work

External links 
 Some of Ion Horaţiu Crişan's books on Amazon UK
 Some of Ion Horaţiu Crişan's books on Google Books
 Crişan's Bibliography at History Institute Cluj-Napoca 

Romanian archaeologists
20th-century Romanian historians
1928 births
1994 deaths
Historiography of Dacia
20th-century archaeologists